Kawkawlin may refer to the geographic locations in the U.S. state of Michigan:

 Kawkawlin Township, Michigan
 Kawkawlin, Michigan, an unincorporated community in Monitor township
 Kawkawlin River, namesake for both the township and community